Al-Mansur Muhammad could refer to the following people:

Al-Mansur Nasir al-Din Muhammad, the Ayyubid sultan of Egypt (r. 1198–1200) 
Al-Mansur I Muhammad, the Ayyubid emir of Hama (r. 1191–1219)
Al-Mansur II Muhammad, the Ayyubid emir of Hama (r. 1244–1284)
Al-Mansur Muhammad, Sultan of Egypt (1347–1398), the Mamluk sultan of Egypt
Al-Mansur Muhammad (died 1505), the Zaidi imam of Yemen in the 15th century
Al-Mansur Muhammad bin Abdallah, the Zaidi imam of Yemen in the mid-19th century
al-Mansur Muhammad bin Yahya Hamid ad-Din, the Zaidi imam of Yemen in 1890–1904
al-Mansur Muhammad al-Badr, the Zaidi imam of Yemen in 1962